Abbas Khel Raghzai is a town in the Khyber Pakhtunkhwa of Pakistan. It is located at 32°22'6N 69°47'14E with an altitude of 1433 metres (4704 feet).

References

Populated places in Khyber Pakhtunkhwa